Jugular vein ectasia is a venous anomaly that commonly presents itself as a unilateral neck swelling in children and adults.  It is rare to have bilateral neck swelling due to internal jugular vein ectasia.

References

External links 

Vascular diseases